Fusonia is an unincorporated community and coal town in Perry County, Kentucky, United States.

The community was named for the Fuson Mining Co., which closed in the 1930s. Their Post Office  has been discontinued.

References

Unincorporated communities in Perry County, Kentucky
Unincorporated communities in Kentucky
Coal towns in Kentucky